Wendell Holmes (August 17, 1914 – April 27, 1962) was an American actor whose career included work in radio, television, Broadway, and film.

Early years
Holmes was born Oliver Wendell Holmes in Cheshire, Ohio to Ferdie and Ada Holmes.  
Census records indicate that by 1930 the family was living in Columbus, Ohio.

Career
An article appearing in The Des Moines Register (1941) mentions Holmes being born on a farm and describes his winning a Chautauqua competition at age six, entering high school at age ten, and graduating from Ohio State University at age 18 with a degree in Education.  It further states that instead of becoming an educator, Holmes hitch-hiked to New York and began working as an actor, starting his radio career in 1934.

An article appearing in The Daily Dispatch (1949) mentions that Holmes' parents were school teachers and adds to the Chautauqua event by noting it took place in Middleport, Ohio, where a talent scout signed him up for more work.

The same Daily Dispatch article (1949) quotes Holmes as saying at the time, "There are about 5,000 radio actors here, and last year they averaged $16 a week salary.  Only about 500 manage to earn a truckdriver's living...When I started in 1934 I got $20 a week for working in 30 shows."

During the years 1947–48, Holmes appeared as Dr. Watson in the adaptation of Sherlock Holmes starring John Stanley, but was credited as "George Spelvin" to avoid confusion between his actual surname and the surname of the show's protagonist.

Over the years, Holmes acted in more than 40 radio dramas, 50 TV episodes, and 10 movies.

Personal life
On June 20, 1938, Holmes married actress Lois E Jesson in Manhattan, New York. Following his divorce (date unknown) from Jesson, Holmes married actress Adrienne Marden in Santa Monica, California, on August 12, 1956.

Wendell Holmes died of what is thought to have been a heart attack in Paris, France, on April 27, 1962.

Radio acting

Filmography

Citations

General bibliography 
 Andreychuk, Ed. Burt Lancaster: A Filmography and Biography. McFarland, 2005.
 Presnell, Don and McGee, Marty. A Critical History of Television's The Twilight Zone, 1959–1964. McFarland, 2015.
 Terrace, Vincent. Radio Programs, 1924–1984: A Catalog of More Than 1800 Shows. McFarland, 2015.

External links
 
 
 
 otr.com – Dimension X
 Jerry Haendiges Vintage Radio Logs
 Wendell Holmes at Find A Grave

1914 births
1962 deaths
American male film actors
American male radio actors
American male television actors
20th-century American male actors